Fortunatus M. Lukanima (December 8, 1940 – March 12, 2014) was a Roman Catholic bishop.

Ordained to the priesthood in 1968, Lukanima was appointed bishop of what is now the Roman Catholic Archdiocese of Arusha, Tanzania in 1989. He resigned in 1998.

Notes

1940 births
2014 deaths
20th-century Roman Catholic bishops in Tanzania
Roman Catholic bishops of Arusha